Desmond is a given name and a surname, derived from the Irish place-name Desmond, an anglicization of the Irish Deas-Mhumhna ("South Munster"). The Irish peerages of Ormonde, Desmond, and Thomond represented the old sub-kingdoms of East, South, and North Munster, respectively. South Munster existed as an independent territory between 1118 and 1543. The title of Earl of Desmond  (fourth creation) in the Peerage of Ireland originates in 1628; it is currently held by Alexander Feilding, 12th Earl of Denbigh (born 1970).

Notable people with the given name 

Desmond Amofah (1990–2019), American YouTuber better known as Etika
Desmond Arthur (1884–1913), Irish Lieutenant in the No. 2 Squadron RAF, known for being the Montrose Ghost
Desmond Connell (1926–2017), Cardinal Archbishop of Dublin
Desmond de Silva, Sri Lankan musician
Desmond Dekker (1941–2006), Jamaican singer
Desmond Devenish, English-American filmmaker
Dez Dickerson (born 1955), American guitarist and singer, former member of Prince's former band The Revolution
Desmond Digby (1933–2015), Australian set and costumer designer and illustrator
Desmond Doss (1919–2006), first conscientious objector to receive the Medal of Honor
Desmond Douglas (born 1955), Jamaican-born British table tennis player
Desmond Elliot (born 1974), Nigerian actor, director and politician
Des Ferrow (1933–2020), New Zealand cricketeer
Desmond Fitzgerald (disambiguation), various people
Desmond Ford (1929–2019), Christian speaker and theologian
Desmond Green (born 1989), American mixed martial artist
Desmond Harrington (born 1976), American actor
Desmond Harrison (American football) (born 1993), American football player
Desmond Haynes (born 1956), West Indian international cricketer
Des Headland (born 1981), Australian Rules footballer
Desmond Howard (born 1970), former National Football League player and Heisman Trophy winner
Desmond Jennings (born 1986), American Major League Baseball player
Des Kelly (born 1965), British journalist
Desmond Kitchings, American football coach 
Desmond King (American football) (born 1994), American football player
 Des Lee (born 1946), Irish musician in The Miami Showband
Desmond Lewis (born 1946), Jamaican cricketer
Desmond Llewelyn (1914–99), Welsh actor
Des Lynam (born 1942), British television presenter
Des Lyttle (born 1971), English footballer
Desmond Mason (born 1977), American basketball player
Desmond McKenzie (born 1952), Jamaican politician
Desmond Morris (born 1928) English zoologist, ethologist, surrealist painter and author (The Naked Ape)
Desmond Muirhead (1923–2002), English-born American golf course designer
Desmond Mullen (born 1966), American producer, director, actor, and writer
Desmond Norman (1929–2002), English aircraft designer and businessman
Desmond N'Ze (born 1989), Italian footballer playing in the Japanese league
Des O'Connor (1932–2020), British entertainer
Desmond O'Malley (1939–2021), Irish politician, government minister and founder and leader of the Progressive Democrats
Des O'Neil (1920–1999), Australian politician
Desmond Rice (1924–2020), British Army officer
Desmond Ridder (born 1999), American football player
Desmond Tan (disambiguation), various people
Desmond Tutu (1931–2021), South African archbishop, civil rights activist and opponent of apartheid

Stage name 

Desmond Child, stage name of John Charles Barrett (born 1953), American songwriter

Notable people with the surname 

 Casey Desmond (born 1986), American singer-songwriter
 Charles S. Desmond (1896–1987), Chief Judge of the New York Court of Appeals
 Connie Desmond (1908–1983), American sportscaster
 Cornelius Desmond (American politician) (1893–1974), Massachusetts state Representative
 Dan Desmond (1913–1964), Irish politician
 Eileen Desmond (1932–2005), Irish politician
 Gerald Desmond (1915–1964), American civic leader and politician
 Humphrey J. Desmond (1858–1932), Wisconsin state legislator, lawyer, writer, and newspaper editor
 Ian Desmond (born 1985), American Major League Baseball player
 Mabel Desmond (1929), former Maine state Representative
 Matthew Desmond, American sociologist
 Meighan Desmond (born 1977), New Zealand actor
 Michael J. Desmond, American lawyer
 Paul Desmond (1924–1977), American jazz saxophonist
 Richard Desmond (born 1951), British publisher
 Robert Desmond (1928–2002), English actor
 Thomas C. Desmond (1887–1972), New York state senator
 Viola Desmond (1914–1965), Canadian beautician and civil rights advocate
 Walter Desmond (1876–1951), American judge

Stage name 

 Johnny Desmond, stage name of Giovanni Alfredo De Simone (1919–1985), American singer active in the 1940s and 1950s
 Olga Desmond, pseudonym taken by Olga Sellin (1891–1964), German dancer and actress who promoted nudity on the stage
 Paul Desmond, stage name of jazz saxophonist Paul Emil Breitenfeld (1924–1977)

Fictional characters

Given Name
 Desmond Ambrose, lead character in the British sitcom Desmond's
 Des Barnes, in the British soap opera Coronation Street
 Desmond Belmont, the only playable in Castlevania: Order of Shadows
 Des Clarke (Neighbours), in the Australian soap opera Neighbours
 Desmond Hume in the television series Lost (2004)
 Desmond Jones, one of the central characters of the Beatles song Ob-La-Di, Ob-La-Da
 Desmond Larochette in the movie The List
 Desmond Miles in the Assassin's Creed series of video games (2007)
 Desmond Sycamore, one of the main characters in the video game Professor Layton and the Azran Legacy
 Des Tiny in the book series The Saga of Darren Shan (2006)

Surname
 Damian Desmond, a character from anime/manga series Spy × Family
 Francine Desmond in the 1980s American TV show Scarecrow and Mrs. King
 Norma Desmond, central character in the 1950 film Sunset Boulevard

See also 

List of Irish-language given names
Dez (disambiguation), sometimes a short form of Desmond (or Dezmond)
Des, frequently a short form of Desmond
Dessie (given name), often a short form of Desmond

References 

Masculine given names
Irish masculine given names 
English masculine given names